Theodore Alfred Schmitt (October 2, 1916 – March 11, 2001) was an American football guard who played three seasons with the Philadelphia Eagles of the National Football League. He played college football at the University of Pittsburgh and attended Carrick High School in Pittsburgh, Pennsylvania.

References

External links
Just Sports Stats

1916 births
2001 deaths
Players of American football from Pittsburgh
American football guards
Pittsburgh Panthers football players
Philadelphia Eagles players